This page lists Dáil constituencies that have been used for elections to Dáil Éireann from the 1918 election to the next general election.

Overview of legislation and seat distribution
In the case of the First Dáil, the constituencies were created for the House of Commons of the United Kingdom; in the case of the Second Dáil, they were created for the Northern Ireland House of Commons and the House of Commons of Southern Ireland. Although only Sinn Féin members took their seats as TDs in the revolutionary period of Dáil Éireann, MPs from other parties were invited; on this basis, all constituencies used in 1918 and 1921 are included in this list of Dáil constituencies. From the Fourth Dáil on, they were adjusted by Irish legislation.

Alterations to constituencies take effect on the dissolution of the Dáil sitting when a revision is made; therefore, any by-elections take place according to the constituency boundaries in place at the previous election.

List of constituencies
Notes
 Constituencies which include all or part of two or more counties are attributed to the first county mentioned in the constituency name or (if none) the predominant county.
 Constituency names are based upon those used in the Oireachtas database of former members, except that borough division names in 1918 and 1977 are not placed in brackets. These names are sometimes not identical to those used in electoral legislation, i.e. compass points always follow the county or borough name in the database.
 In Irish legislation up to 1961, constituencies in the cities of Cork and Dublin (then known as county boroughs) were designated as borough constituencies. The official designation of borough and county constituencies under Irish electoral law ended in 1969. In UK legislation, relevant for the constituencies of the First and Second Dáil, it was also used to designate Belfast, Limerick, Londonderry and Waterford in 1918, and Belfast in 1921.

See also
Irish House of Commons for constituencies in the Irish House of Commons between 1297 and 1801.
List of United Kingdom Parliament constituencies in Ireland and Northern Ireland for constituencies in the House of Commons of the United Kingdom
List of Irish constituencies for a combined list of all Irish constituencies.

References

Sources

External links
 Houses of the Oireachtas – TDs & Senators
 

History of Ireland (1801–1923)
 
 
 
Dail